Vyacheslav Petrovich  Lunyov (born May 9, 1940) is a Soviet football goalkeeper. Master of Sports of the USSR.

The pupil of FC Minsk. Since 1959 to 1961 he played for FC Belarus, wore in 1959 the name of  Spartak, composed of the strongest at the time of the Minsk's club played 29 matches, 7 of them in the highest level of the league of the USSR.

Season 1962 held in  FC Spartak (Krasnodar) in 3 meetings of the championship missed 3 goals, the team eventually won the Class  B  and a champion of the RSFSR. From 1963 to 1964 he played for  FC Zenit from Izhevsk. From 1965 to 1968, he defended the colors of FC Lokomotiv Kaluga, 81 of which played a match and in 1966 became the champion of the Russian Federation.

References

External links
 Profile Online, footbook.ru

1940 births
Living people
Soviet footballers
Association football goalkeepers
FC Dinamo Minsk players
FC Kuban Krasnodar players
FC Izhevsk players
FC Lokomotiv Kaluga players
People from Borzinsky District